Major-General Sir John Noble Kennedy,  (31 August 1893 – 15 June 1970) was a senior British Army officer who served as Assistant Chief of the Imperial General Staff during World War II.

Early life
Kennedy was born on 31 August 1893 in Portpatrick, the son of the Minister James Russell Kennedy and his wife Sarah.

Military career
Kennedy joined the Royal Navy in 1911 and then transferred to the Royal Artillery at the start of World War I in 1915 going on to see action in France, Flanders and Egypt. He was awarded the Military Cross during his service, the citation for which reads:

He then served with the British Military Mission in South Russia during the Russian Civil War, for which he was mentioned in dispatches.

After attending the Staff College, Camberley from 1921 to 1922 (returning there as an instructor from 1931−1934), he was appointed Deputy Director of Military Operations at the War Office in 1938. He also served in World War II as Director of Plans at the War Office from 1939, Commander Royal Artillery for 52nd Division from early 1940 and as Director of Military Operations at the War Office from later that year. He went on to be Assistant Chief of the Imperial General Staff in October 1943 until February 1945.

He was Governor of Southern Rhodesia from 1947 to 1953.

Family
In 1926 Kennedy married Isabella Rosamond Georgiana Joicey-Cecil (1901–1941). Kennedy married Catherine Fordham (1905–1969) in 1942; on 2 January 1939 Catherine Fordham had been appointed Lady-in-Waiting to Her Royal Highness Princess Helena Victoria of Schleswig-Holstein-Sonderburg-Augustenburg (1870–1948).

References

Bibliography

External links
General's of World War II

 

|-

 

1893 births
1970 deaths 
Military personnel from Dumfries and Galloway
British Army generals of World War II
Royal Artillery officers
Knights Grand Cross of the Order of St Michael and St George
Knights Commander of the Royal Victorian Order
Knights Commander of the Order of the British Empire
Companions of the Order of the Bath
Recipients of the Military Cross
Governors of Southern Rhodesia
Graduates of the Staff College, Camberley
Royal Navy officers
People from Dumfries and Galloway
British Army personnel of World War I
British Army major generals
Academics of the Staff College, Camberley
British Army personnel of the Russian Civil War
War Office personnel in World War II